Lepidogma melanospila is a species of snout moth in the genus Lepidogma. It was described by George Hampson in 1916 and is known from Ghana (including the type location, Bibianaha).

References

Endemic fauna of Ghana
Moths described in 1916
Epipaschiinae
Insects of West Africa
Moths of Africa